Stockman is a surname. Notable people with the surname include:

Billy Stockman Tjapaltjarri (1927–2015), Australian artist
David Stockman (born 1946), former US Representative and Director of the Office of Management and Budget
Farah Stockman (born 1974), American journalist
Gerald R. Stockman (born 1934), American politician
Harry Stockman (1919–1994), American racing driver
Hayley Stockman (born 1985), New Zealand netball player
Jacques Stockman (1938–2013), Belgian football player
Lily Stockman (born 1982), American artist and writer
Lowell Stockman (1901–1962), former US Representative
Mark Stockman (1947–2020), Soviet-born American physicist
Phil Stockman (born 1980), British baseball player
Ralph Stockman Tarr (1864–1912), American geographer
René Stockman (born 1954), Belgian religious leader
Ron Stockman (born 1934), Australian football player
Sam Stockman (born 1982), British actor
Shawn Stockman (born 1972), American singer
Steve Stockman (born 1956), former US Representative

Fictional characters
Baxter Stockman, fictional character in the Teenage Mutant Ninja Turtles

See also
Stockmann (surname)